Olonisakin is a Nigerian surname. Notable people with the surname include:

Abayomi Olonisakin (born 1961), Nigerian Chief of Defence Staff
Dami Olonisakin (born 1990), British Nigerian sex educator and relationship advisor
Funmi Olonisakin (born 1965), British Nigerian scholar

Surnames of Nigerian origin